Khaleke Hudson (born December 6, 1997) is an American football linebacker for the Washington Commanders of the National Football League (NFL). He played college football at Michigan and was drafted by Washington in the fifth round of the 2020 NFL Draft. He shares an NCAA record for most tackles for a loss in a single game with eight, doing so in 2017.

Early career
Hudson attended McKeesport Area High School in Pennsylvania where he played safety and running back. He was recruited by several top programs as a two-way player. At the time of his January 27, 2016 commitment to Michigan he was the number one rated football prospect in the Pennsylvania statewide class of 2016 according to Scout.com and had offers from Pittsburgh, UCLA, and Penn State.

College career

Hudson made his debut on September 3, 2016, against Hawaii. In the 2016 campaign, Khaleke made an appearance in all 13 games primarily on special teams. Khaleke only appeared in 2 games as a Safety, and was the Special Teams Player of the Game after a home win against Illinois. On November 4, 2017, he set the school single-game record with eight tackles for loss against Minnesota in the Little Brown Jug rivalry game, earning Big Ten Conference Co-Defensive Player of the week. Hudson was recognized as the FWAA/Bronko Nagurski National Defensive Player of the Week for the effort (15 total tackles, 12 of which were solo, 3 quarterback sacks, and a forced fumble), which tied an NCAA single-game record and set a Big Ten Conference tackle for loss record. Following the 2017 season, Hudson, who was second in the conference in tackles for loss for the season, earned third-team All-Big Ten recognition from the coaches.

Prior to his junior season in 2018, Hudson was named to preseason watch lists for the Lott Trophy and Bronko Nagurski Trophy. He was named preseason first-team all-Big Ten by Athlon Sports. Hudson appeared in all 13 games for the Wolverines but assumed a lesser role in the defense than his sophomore season. He finished with three tackles for loss and 39 total tackles on the year, and was named an honorable mention all-conference selection by both media and coaches.

As a senior, Hudson was named to the preseason watchlist for the Butkus Award. During the 2019 season, Hudson was Michigan's leading tackler with a career-best 97 stops, including 3.5 for loss with two sacks. He added three pass breakups, three quarterback hurries, and a blocked kick. In the following the season Hudson was named to second-team 2019 All-Big Ten.

Professional career

Hudson was selected by the Washington Football Team in the fifth round (162nd overall) of the 2020 NFL Draft. He signed his four-year rookie contract with the team on July 23, 2020. 

On December 7, 2021, Hudson was placed on injured reserve after suffering an ankle injury in the Week 13 game against the Las Vegas Raiders.

On August 30, 2022, Hudson was waived by the Commanders and signed to the practice squad the next day. He was promoted to the active roster on October 21. He signed a one-year contract extension on March 12, 2023.

References

External links

Washington Commanders bio
Michigan Wolverines bio

1997 births
Living people
Players of American football from Pennsylvania
Sportspeople from McKeesport, Pennsylvania
American football defensive backs
American football linebackers
Michigan Wolverines football players
Washington Commanders players
Washington Football Team players